Shaker's Shocker was a Tennessee Walking Horse stallion who won his breed's World Grand Championship in 1966.

Life
Shaker's Shocker was foaled in 1962, by World Grand Champion Mack K's Handshaker and out of My Darling. He was bred by Tom Barham of Lewisburg, Tennessee. He was sold to the Sain family in the fall of 1962 and his name was subsequently changed by Betty Sain. Shaker's Shocker sired 195 foals in his lifetime; after his retirement from showing, he was the lead sire at Sain Stables. He died October 13, 1981.

Career

Betty Sain trained Shaker's Shocker entirely by herself; the first time she rode him, her father was in the hospital. 
Sain began showing Shaker's Shocker as a two-year-old in 1964, and he had a fairly successful season.
In 1966, Betty Sain entered Shaker's Shocker in the Tennessee Walking Horse National Celebration. He won the four-year-old World Championship, referred to as the "junior stake" and was entered in the World Grand Championship, an open class for all ages of horses. Shaker's Shocker won, making Sain the first woman to win the class.
Shaker's Shocker was the only Tennessee Walking Horse to have ever been given the Sports Illustrated Award of Merit.
Shaker's Shocker retired from showing in 1970 and was put to stud at Sain's stables. He was also used as a mascot for University of Tennessee football games.
Shaker's Shocker and Betty Sain have been given a historic marker in Tennessee. There is a permanent exhibit on them in the Tennessee Walking Horse National Museum.

References

Individual Tennessee Walking Horses
World Grand Champion Tennessee Walking Horses